R. T. Ramachandran (4 July 1947 – 4 February 2021) was an Indian cricket umpire. He stood in four One Day International (ODI) matches between 1993 and 1998.

See also
 List of One Day International cricket umpires

References

1947 births
2021 deaths
Indian One Day International cricket umpires
Cricketers from Nagpur